Al Khums Sports Cultural Social Club is a Libyan football club based in Al Khums which plays in the Libyan Premier League. The club plays its home games at Al Khums Stadium in Alriadya neighbourhood.

History
At the end of the 1950s, there was an urgent necessity and urgent need for the emergence of culture, sports and the arts in the city of Khoms, a city that had a distinct wealth of ambitious young people who were jealous of their city, and amid the four walls of what was known as "Ghuma's shop". The spark for the beginning of sports activities, especially football, as a football team was made to become legitimate and entitled to participate in sports courses. These were undertaked for the benefit of sport. The required documentation & licences were given to the young people of this city. Listed below were among the founders of the club:

Mohammed Hadaar
Rajab Mohammed Dhuwaila
Sadiq Muftah Morjane
Mohammed Yahya Ali
Mahmoud Harati
Achour Abdel'aaly
Mohamed Hadiya
Abdulrahman Abu 'Amoud

A base of operations, a transport station, was found, although this did not last long, as the club used the hotel in Khoms, between 1965 and 1966. The club changed location again, this time behind the Arab Cement Building in Khoms, where it remains today.

In 2012, the club changed its name from Al Harati Sports Cultural Social Club to Al Khums Sports Cultural Social Club.

In 2016 the club promoted to the Libyan Premier League for the first time in its history.

League positions

Football clubs in Libya